Creative license can refer to
Artistic license, also known as dramatic license
Creative Commons licenses, a family of copyright licenses